Diamonds Are Brittle is a 1965 French romantic crime film directed by Nicolas Gessner.

Cast
Jean Seberg as Bettina Ralton
Claude Rich as Bernard Noblet
Elsa Martinelli as Juliette
Pierre Vernier as Roger
Jacques Morel as Amédée de St. Leu
Jean-Paul Moulinot as Le bijoutier
Jacques Balutin as Un agent
Elisabeth Flickenschildt as Madame Ralton
France Rumilly as La dame à la bague
Daniel Ceccaldi as Le capitaine du bateau
Claude Darget as L'inspecteur cantonal
Henri Virlojeux as Picard
Annette Poivre as Une femme de ménage
Jacques Dynam as Le commissaire
Pierre Mirat as Un brigadier
 as Prof. Schmoll

References

External links
 

1965 films
1965 crime films
French crime films
German crime films
Swiss crime films
Italian crime films
West German films
1960s French-language films
French heist films
Films directed by Nicolas Gessner
Films set in Switzerland
Romantic crime films
1960s French films
1960s Italian films
1960s German films